Emphreus ferruginosoides is a species of beetle in the family Cerambycidae. It was described by Stephan von Breuning in 1971.

References

Stenobiini
Beetles described in 1971
Taxa named by Stephan von Breuning (entomologist)